The contrabass recorder is a wind instrument in F2 that belongs to the family of recorders.

The contrabass recorder plays an octave lower than the ordinary bass (or "basset") recorder. Until recently, it was the largest instrument in the recorder family, but since 1975 has been exceeded by the sub-great bass recorder (also called "contra-great bass" or  simply "contrabass" recorder) in C2 and the sub-contrabass recorder in F1.

Due to the length of the instrument, the lowest tone, F, requires a key. On modern instruments, keys may also be provided for low F, G, and G, and sometimes for C and C as well.

Occasionally, this size of instrument may be equipped with so-called "diapason" keys, which extend its range downward by a perfect fourth to low C2.

In the early 17th century, Michael Praetorius used the diminutive term "basset" (small bass) to describe the recorder that served as the lowest member of the "four-foot" consort, in which the instruments sound an octave higher than the corresponding human voices. Praetorius calls the next-lower instrument (bottom note B2) a "bass", and the instrument an octave lower than the basset (with bottom note F2) a Großbaß, "great" or "large bass".

Because Praetorius's term "great bass" today is often applied to the next-smaller size of instrument in C3, the low-F bass is often designated "contrabass" by modern writers and instrument makers in a (largely futile) attempt to avoid confusion. However, the name "contrabass" is sometimes used for the next-larger size (in C2), instead. The modern notation for this instrument is usually in the bass clef at sounding pitch, unlike most other sizes of recorders which are notated an octave lower than they sound.

References

Works cited

General references
 
 

Baroque instruments
Early musical instruments
Internal fipple flutes
Recorders (musical instruments)